Verticordia integra, commonly known as plastic verticordia,  is a flowering plant in the myrtle family, Myrtaceae and is endemic to the south-west of Western Australia. It is a shrub with only a few branches, with very thick oblong to egg-shaped leaves and heads of shiny golden-coloured flowers in late spring.

Description
Leaves near the flowers are similar in shape but shorter.

Flowering mostly occurs from October to November.

Taxonomy and naming
Verticordia integra was first formally described by Alex George in 1991 and the description was published in Nuytsia from specimens found near Newdegate by Alex and Elizabeth George.

The specific epithet (integra) is derived from the Latin word integer meaning "untouched" or "unhurt" referring to the entire or smooth-edged petals.

When George reviewed the genus in 1991, he placed this species in subgenus Chrysoma, section Sigalantha along with V. serrata.

Distribution and habitat
This verticordia usually grows in association with other species of verticordia in sand with lateritic gravel, loam or clay in heath. It mainly occurs in the area between Lake Biddy, Lake Magenta , Lake King and Ravensthorpe in the Esperance Plains and Mallee biogeographic regions.

Conservation
Verticordia integra is classified as "Priority Four" by the Western Australian Government Department of Parks and Wildlife, meaning that is rare or near threatened.

Use in horticulture
This verticordia has been difficult to propagate and establish in the garden but when successful produces a bushier plant than wild specimens. It has been propagated from cuttings but establishing them in the garden has been difficult.

References

integra
Rosids of Western Australia
Eudicots of Western Australia
Plants described in 1991